The Coalition to Abolish the Fur Trade (CAFT) is an informal international coalition of grassroots groups that campaign against the production and use of animal fur for clothing and other items. It started in the US in the 1990s, when fur farms were being raided quite regularly.

CAFT-UK
There are several CAFT branches around the world, but the one in the United Kingdom has the biggest internet presence. As at Oct 2008, they are running a campaign against the London-based department store Harrods, because it sells garments containing real fur.

In 2007 CAFT-UK announced the results a two-year investigation into the use of rabbit fur. They infiltrated farms, slaughterhouses, dressing companies, manufacturers and retailers, getting photographic and video evidence of the process.

See also
List of animal rights groups

Notes

External links 
 Homepage of the UK branch of Coalition to Abolish the Fur Trade
 BBC NEWS Action demanded on cat and dog fur
 BBC NEWS New calls for fur trade ban
 CAFT Harrods Fur Protests

Animal rights organizations